The Remarkables are a mountain range and skifield in Otago in the South Island of New Zealand. Located on the southeastern shore of Lake Wakatipu, the range lives up to its name by rising sharply to create a remarkable backdrop for the waters. The range is clearly visible from the nearby town of Queenstown.

The highest point in the range is Single Cone (2319 metres). The adjacent Tapuae-o-Uenuku / Hector Mountains southeast of the Remarkables culminate in Mount Tūwhakarōria (2307 m).

There are a number of small lakes on the mountains including Lake Alta which forms part of the Remarkables Skifield.

Name
The original Ngāi Tahu inhabitants called the mountains , and gave the same name to the Kawarau River which starts beneath them.

The mountains were named The Remarkables by Alexander Garvie in 1857-58, allegedly because they are one of only two mountain ranges in the world which run directly north to south. An alternate explanation for the name given by locals is that early Queenstown settlers, upon seeing the mountain range during sunset one evening, named them the Remarkables to describe the sight.

Skifield
During the winter months, the Remarkables skifield has skiing and other winter activities. The ski area has three mountain bowls covering  220 ha (540 acres) with eight lifts (4 chairlifts, 4 magic carpets). Terrain is rated as 30% beginners, 40% intermediate and 30% advanced. Average annual snowfall is 3.67 metres. In 2007 automated snowmaking was installed and a new snow groomer has also been acquired. There's also a snow tubing park and in 2008 a terrain park was developed. The Remarkables are part of NZSki, which incorporate Coronet Peak and Mt Hutt.
In the 2014 winter season, a new lodge base building and a new 6-seater express detachable chairlift have been inaugurated. A second 6-seater express detachable chairlift has been installed in 2020 to replace an old chairlift. In the late future, there is plans to extend the terrain and improve the ski field. An independent operator have released his plans to build a gondola lift from the Remarkables Town Center to the ski field's base.

References

External links

The Remarkables official website
NZSki Ltd official website
The Remarkables Webcams and Weather Report
Ski Queenstown official website

Ski areas and resorts in Otago
Mountain ranges of Otago
Queenstown-Lakes District
Southern Alps
Sport in Queenstown, New Zealand